Stem Cell Reports is a monthly peer-reviewed open access journal covering research into stem cells. It was established in 2013 and is published exclusively online by Cell Press. It is the official journal of the International Society for Stem Cell Research. The editor-in-chief is Martin Pera (Jackson Laboratory). According to the Journal Citation Reports, the journal has a 2020 impact factor of 7.765.

References

External links

Regenerative medicine journals
Stem cell research
Cell Press academic journals
Academic journals associated with international learned and professional societies
English-language journals
Publications established in 2013
Monthly journals
Online-only journals
Open access journals